Musha Cay is a , privately owned island in the Exuma Chain, in the southern Bahamas. It is owned by illusionist David Copperfield.

Musha Cay is surrounded by three smaller islands that maintain its guests' privacy. There can only be one group of guests, numbering up to twenty-four, at any one time.

Google co-founder Sergey Brin was married on Musha Cay in May 2007.

Howard Holtzman is the architect for Musha Cay.

References

Musha Cay
Exuma